Deng Daokun (born May 22, 1978 in Haikou, Hainan) is a male Chinese sports sailor. He competed for Team China at the 2008 Summer Olympics, and also participated in the 2012 Summer Olympics.

Major performances
2002/2004/2006 National Championships - 3rd/2nd/2nd 470 class;
2005/2006/2008 National Champions Tournament - 1st 470 class;
2007 National Water Sports Games/National Championships - 1st 470 class

References
 http://2008teamchina.olympic.cn/index.php/personview/personsen/836

External links 
 
 
 
 

1978 births
Living people
Chinese male sailors (sport)
Olympic sailors of China
People from Haikou
Sailors at the 2008 Summer Olympics – 470
Sailors at the 2012 Summer Olympics – 470
Asian Games medalists in sailing
Sportspeople from Hainan
Sailors at the 2010 Asian Games
Sailors at the 2006 Asian Games
Medalists at the 2010 Asian Games
Asian Games silver medalists for China
21st-century Chinese people